Ghost soldiers or ghost battalions refers to army troops whose names appear on military rolls, but who are not actually in military service, generally in order to divert part of the soldiers' salaries to an influential local entity such as army officers or others. Soldiers may equally benefit from the corruption scheme by returning to their civilian occupation and routine while gaining marginal income. The practice, however, weakens the military and makes it susceptible to military offensives and major defeats when leaders ignore available troops. Ghost soldiers have been cited in Iraq, Afghanistan, and other countries.

Transnational 
In a 2008 transnational analysis, Hudson and Jones found a negative correlation between the level of corruption of a country and the cost per soldiers, which makes sense when factoring in ghost soldiers, who imply lower maintenance costs.

Historic cases

South Vietnam
Some officers in the Army of the Republic of Vietnam during the Vietnam War retained soldiers who had been killed or deserted on their rolls as "ghost soldiers". As units were allocated a set amount of rice for each soldier monthly, this allowed the officers to sell the excess rice for their own profit. ARVN officers also sometimes stole the pay allocated to these non-existent soldiers. This corruption was sufficiently widespread that it led to a significant over-estimation of the size of the army.

Russia 
During the First and Second Chechen War in the Caucasus and the era in between them, there were reports of Russian soldiers being listed on the payroll of the Army, who either did not exist or had deserted from their military duty while their commanding officers pocketed their pay. There were also reports of conscripts not being paid at all, being worked as slaves by their commanding officers while these same officers stole the soldiers' salaries.

Uganda 

Tangri and Mwenda (2006), in a study of Uganda People's Defense Force (UPDF), estimate its ghost soldiers to 30% of its force. Efforts to launch anti-corruption investigations by the Inspector General of Government on the UPDF have not been permitted "because sizable amounts obtained from corrupt military procurement and the phenomenon of 'ghost' soldiers were available for building political support for President Yoweri Museveni".

Iraq 

The presence of ghost soldiers and battalions has been cited as a key reason for the chain of rapid and disastrous collapses and defeats of the Iraqi army by ISIS in early 2013-2014 offensives. Cases of army officers and soldiers splitting the soldier's salary in exchange for not having to show to the military barracks, works, and training are documented. The soldiers are then free to return to their civilian profession and routine, but have to return periodically to renew various certificates under the protection of his officer. The practice also provided Iraqi soldiers the possibility to retire after 10 years of such ghost service.

The military under Iraqi Prime Minister Nouri al-Maliki administration was known for its corruption, Maliki was Minister of National Security affairs, Minister of the Interior and Prime Minister up to September 8, 2014. When ISIS increased its activity in the first part of the 2013–2017 War in Iraq, the Iraqi army went through several spectacular debacles, including the June 2014 northern Iraq offensive which saw the catastrophic collapse of the army in that region and the fall of Mosul, where an army of 1,500 ISIS militants routed over 60,000 declared Iraqi soldiers.

It bestowed his successor, Prime Minister Haidar al-Abadi, to fight this corruption. After investigation, Abadi publicly announced in late November 2014 the discovery of 50,000 ghost soldiers, for an estimated annual loss of $360 million USD assuming an average monthly salary of $600. Some have suggested the loss could be 3 times larger. Abadi has retired dozens of officers accused of corruption and of promoting their sub-officers based on loyalty rather than merit.

Afghanistan 

In 2016, at least 40% of the names on the Afghan National Army roster in the Helmand province didn't exist. A 2016 report by the Special Inspector General for Afghanistan Reconstruction (SIGAR) said,  “neither the United States nor its Afghan allies know how many Afghan soldiers and police actually exist, how many are in fact available for duty, or, by extension, the true nature of their operational capabilities”.

Officers siphoned off the salaries and rations for the ghost soldiers, which were one major phenomenon of endemic corruption in Afghanistan. In Helmand, one base of 100 soldiers was left with only 50 soldiers; the other half were ordered to go back home while the commanding officer pocketed their salaries. When another base officially manned by 300 soldiers was attacked, only 15 soldiers were actually present. Officers failed to report up their troops' desertions, deaths or departures, in order to hide failures and pocket the ghost soldiers' allowances.

Meanwhile, actual troops on isolated rural outposts and the front lines faced low morale and harsh living conditions, with poor nutrition such as simple rice and tea. Troops engaged in smuggling drugs for additional income and using drugs, which can be reported to hostile forces and initiate an attack when soldiers are still under the influence of those drugs. Border patrol staff, which are not combat units, were forced to fill the gaps and defend positions when needed. While the US-led coalition's military might and airstrikes provided decisive military advantages, long-term socio-economic solutions were needed to reinforce Afghan's military forces.

In early 2019, at least 42,000 ghost soldiers were removed from the Afghan army's payroll.

Until shortly before the August 15, 2021 takeover by the Taliban, the Afghan Armed Forces were on paper an army of 300,000 trained soldiers supported by the Afghan Air Force, built over the previous two decades by US and NATO efforts. Over the course of weeks it was routed by a much smaller Taliban force, with most provincial capitals falling with little or no resistance. Khalid Payenda, the former Afghan finance minister, said in 2021, after the Afghan government's collapse, that most of the 300,000 soldiers and police on the government's roster did not exist, and the official count may have been six times larger than the actual count (suggested as 50,000 soldiers), or about +80% of ghost soldiers. "Ghost soldiers" and massive corruption in the military were a major cause of the rapid collapse of the Afghan government after the U.S. withdrawal.

See also 
 No-show job

References

Military personnel
War in Afghanistan (2001–2021)
Corruption in Afghanistan